William Lake may refer to:

People
William A. Lake (1808–1861), U.S. Representative from Mississippi
William Lake (Dean of Durham) (1817–1895), English cleric and college head
William Lake (Dean of Antigua) (1947–2003)
Bill Lake, Canadian actor
Anthony Lake (William Anthony Kirsopp Lake, born 1939), U.S. government official

Places
William Lake (Québec), a lake on the Bécancour River in Centre-du-Québec, Quebec, Canada
William Lake Provincial Park, provincial park in Manitoba